Pablo Javier García Lafluf (born 15 April 1999) is a Uruguayan professional footballer who plays as a midfielder for Nacional.

Career

Club
García began his career in his homeland of Uruguay, Liverpool were his first club. He was an unused substitute for a Uruguayan Primera División fixture with Montevideo Wanderers on 6 February 2016, which preceded his professional debut on 13 February during an away loss versus Plaza Colonia. After ten further appearances in all competitions across three campaigns, García departed at the conclusion of 2017 after rejecting a new contract with Liverpool. In January 2018, García left to join Argentine football by signing for River Plate of the Argentine Primera División. A year later, García returned to Uruguay with 2018 runner-ups Nacional.

International
García represented Uruguay at U17 and U20 level. He scored for the U17s in a friendly with the United States in June 2017, while he was selected by the U20s for the 2018 Panda Cup. García was picked by Fabián Coito for the 2019 South American U-20 Championship in Chile.

Career statistics
.

References

External links

1999 births
Living people
Footballers from Montevideo
Uruguayan footballers
Uruguay youth international footballers
Uruguay under-20 international footballers
Association football midfielders
Uruguayan expatriate footballers
Uruguayan Primera División players
Liverpool F.C. (Montevideo) players
Club Atlético River Plate footballers
Club Nacional de Football players
Club Atlético River Plate (Montevideo) players
Coritiba Foot Ball Club players
Uruguayan expatriate sportspeople in Argentina
Uruguayan expatriate sportspeople in Brazil
Expatriate footballers in Argentina
Expatriate footballers in Brazil